Meet the Izzards is a 2014 two-part BBC One documentary in which actor and comedian Eddie Izzard uses genetics to trace Izzard's distant ancestry.

The first part, titled "The Mum's Line", uses Izzard's mitochondrial DNA to trace the maternal line. Izzard thus travels to the Kalahari Desert in Africa, then on to the Middle East, Turkey, Italy, Denmark and finally, England. Prior to traveling to Denmark, Izzard's mitochondrial haplogroup is identified as T2f1a1.

In the second part, titled "The Dad's Line", Izzard's Y-chromosomal DNA lineage is traced. In this episode, Izzard travels to Cameroon, and again returns to England via Saxony, Germany. This episode reveals that Izzard belongs to the Y haplogroup I-M223.

References

External links 
 
 

2013 British television series debuts
2013 British television series endings
BBC television documentaries about science
BBC high definition shows
English-language television shows
Genetics in the United Kingdom
Television series about family history
Works about genetics